Who's Gonna Play This Old Piano? is a 1972 song recorded by Jerry Lee Lewis and written by country music songwriter, Ray Griff. Released on Lewis' 1972 album of the same name, the song peaked at #14 on the Billboard Hot Country Singles chart.

Content
The song is about a man who wonders who will continue to play sad songs for his lover on his piano after he dies. The song is unique in that it fuses old-fashioned ragtime, Dixieland jazz and rockabilly elements, in addition to the (then) modern countrypolitan sound.

Chart performance

References
 

Songs about music
Songs about musicians
Songs about pianos
Jerry Lee Lewis songs
1972 singles
1972 songs
Mercury Records singles
Songs written by Ray Griff